Marcel's Quantum Kitchen is an American television program broadcast by the Syfy channel. The first episode premiered on March 22, 2011 at 10 pm EST. The series follows Marcel Vigneron of Top Chef fame in his new molecular gastronomy catering company, where each episode features the development of unique dishes for a client's event and the event itself. In the creation of dishes, Vigneron draws inspiration from the client and the purpose of the event which has resulted in dishes such as a hash brown bird's nest with tomato foam egg and liquor-filled bonbon engagement rings in a passionfruit marshmallow pillow box.  Due to low ratings, the show was cancelled after 6 episodes.

Team
Marcel Vigneron - Executive chef and molecular gastronomist.
Jarrid Masse - Sous chef and fabricator for Vigneron's serving displays.
Devon Espinosa - Sous chef and mixologist; friend of Marcel's from culinary school.
Robyn Wilson - Prep cook with experience in the catering industry.
Sally Camacho - (additional member called in for complex desserts) Pastry chef specializing in chocolate and sugar works, wedding cakes, bonbons, and plate desserts.
Katsuya Fukushima - (additional member called in for extra help) Chef and protégé of José Andrés, as well as Marcel's friend. Specializing in avant-garde cooking techniques.

Episodes

References

External links

2011 American television series debuts
2010s American cooking television series
2011 American television series endings
Syfy original programming
Molecular gastronomy